Calada fuegensis is a species of moth of the family Hepialidae. It is endemic to Argentina.

References

External links
Hepialidae genera

Moths described in 1983
Hepialidae
Endemic fauna of Argentina
Moths of South America